Stephensia cedronellae is a moth of the family Elachistidae. It is found on the Canary Islands.

The wingspan is 6.5–7 mm. The forewings are tawny fuscous, with some faint pale sprinkling. The hindwings are dark grey.

The larvae feed on Bystropogon origanifolius, Bystropogon plumosus, Calamintha, Cedronella canariensis, Lavandula canariensis, Lavandula stoechas, Mentha and Micromeria. They mine the leaves of their host plant. The mine has the form of a narrow gallery, often following the leaf margin for some distance. The mine ends in a large full depth blotch. In the corridor, the frass is deposited in a central line, while it is deposited in the form of scattered grains within the blotch. Larvae can be found from January to March.

References

Moths described in 1908
Elachistidae
Moths of Africa